Tugimaantee 21 (ofcl. abbr. T21), also called the Rakvere–Luige highway, is a 69.6-kilometre-long national basic road in northeastern Estonia. The highway runs from the center of the town of Rakvere to the west side of Mustvee at national road 36.

See also
 Transport in Estonia

References

External links

N21